Buenos Aires, ciudad de ensueño (English language:Buenos Aires, City of Dreams) is a 1922 Argentine musical film directed and written by José A. Ferreyra. The film premiered in Argentina on 26 September 1922.

It is a tango-based film, one of many directed by José A. Ferreyra.

Cast
María E. Castro as Rosa Juana, la soñadora
Carlos Dux as Demetrio
Elena Guido as Lina, la sacrificada
Jorge Lafuente as Juan de Dios, el campesino
Carlos Lasalle as Alberto, el patoterito
Lidia Liss as Magdalena
Enrique Parigi as Enrique, el de la ciudad
Elsa Rey as Elsa, la campesina

External links

1922 films
Tango films
Argentine black-and-white films
Films directed by José A. Ferreyra
Argentine silent films
1920s musical films
Films set in Buenos Aires
Argentine musical films